Father Hennepin is an American alternative country band from Duluth, Minnesota. Since releasing the debut album "Crooked With Gin" in 2001, the band has been perennial headliners of the Homegrown Music Festival in Duluth.

Frontman Starfire is the founder of the Homegrown Music Festival, pirate radio station Random Radio, and Perfect Duluth Day. Father Hennepin is best known for their revival of the Moose Wallow Ramblers song written by John Berquist, "I Like It in Duluth".

Lineup
 Starfire-- guitar, vocals
 Bob Olson-- guitar
 "Wolfman" Ted Anderson, guitar, vocals
 Brad Nelson, drums
 Susie Ludwig, keyboard/accordion

Discography

Studio albums
 Crooked With Gin – (Shaky Ray Records, 2001)

Compilations
 Duluth Does Dylan – (Spinout Records, 2000)
 Iron Country – (Spinout Records, 2000)
 Homegrown Rawk and/or Roll: Starfire's Mix – (Homegrown Music Festival, 2008)

References

Godsey, Chris. Deep Melancholy and Boundless Creativity : Duluth Does Itself Again MNArtists, April 26, 2006.
Scholtes, Peter S . Hey, We're in Duluth. City Pages, February 7, 2001.

External links
 Shaky Ray Records Discography

Indie rock musical groups from Minnesota
Musical groups established in 1998